Rajneeti may refer to:

 Raajneeti, a 2010 Indian political thriller film
 Rajneeti, a 2017 Bangladeshi socio-political drama film